Kazakh famine may refer to:

 Kazakh famine of 1919–1922, a period of mass starvation and drought in the Kirghiz and Turkestan ASSRs
 Kazakh famine of 1932–33, a man-made famine in the Kazakh ASSR